KTHN (92.1 FM, "Thunder County 92.1") is a radio station broadcasting a country music format. Licensed to La Junta, Colorado, United States, the station is currently owned by 25-7 Media, Inc.  The programming is primarily produced by 25-7 Media employees.  The station does air Intelligence for Your Life featuring John Tesh in the evenings.

On June 1, 2022, KTHN rebranded as "Thunder Country 92.1".

References

External links

THN
Country radio stations in the United States